Varangu Nature Reserve is a nature reserve which is located in Lääne-Viru County, Estonia.

The area of the nature reserve is 105 ha.

The protected area was founded in 1993 to protect the flora in Varangu village (Väike-Maarja Parish). In 2005, the protected area was designated to the nature reserve.

References

Nature reserves in Estonia
Geography of Lääne-Viru County